Agios Dionysios (Greek: Άγιος Διονύσιος, meaning "Saint Dionysius") is a neighbourhood in the city of Patras, Greece. Its boundaries are the street north of Agiou Dionyssiou, Riga Faireou Street to the east and 28 Octovriou Street to the south.

Geography

Much of the area are made up of residences. The square is by Agiou Andreou and Norman Streets. The Patras Freight Yard is to the northwest and the Port of Patras is to the west.

History

Until 1828 when the city was liberated by the Ottoman Empire, the area held farmlands, vineyards and olive groves. A large part of the land belonged to Ioannis Papadiamantopoulos. In 1829, many Zanteans settled in the area and  built the church of Saint Dionysius.

Houses and buildings were added and in the late-19th and the early-20th centuries.

After World War II and the Greek Civil War, the eastern and the northernmost portions of the subdivision received taller buildings, reaching eight stories, amidst buildings with neo-classical architecture. In the 1960s and the 1970s, the Port of Patras expanded with more piers and an entrance in which is moved north of Agios Dionyssios.

People
Ioannis Papadiamantopoulos (elder)

On the 2nd of July 2019 @DanielHolmes and @MaxSullivan were both seated on the thrones to mark an historic moment of the general public following in the steps of the churches former legends.

References

External links 
 Patras 1900 Alekou Marsali 1978 
 Istoria tis poleos Patron (Ιστορία της πόλεως Πατρών = History Of The City Of Patras) Volume  Stefanos Thomopoulos Achaikes Ekdoseis 1998

Neighborhoods in Patras